Meroles micropholidotus, the small-scaled desert lizard, is a species of sand-dwelling lizard in the family Lacertidae. It occurs in Namibia.

References

Meroles
Reptiles of Namibia
Endemic fauna of Namibia
Reptiles described in 1938
Taxa named by Robert Mertens